Cussetia is a genus of flowering plants belonging to the family Podostemaceae.

Its native range is Indo-China.

Species:

Cussetia carinata 
Cussetia diversifolia

References

Podostemaceae
Malpighiales genera